The Kirby 25 is a Canadian trailerable sailboat, that was designed by Bruce Kirby as a racer and first built in 1978. The design is out of production.

Production
The boat was built by Mirage Yachts in Canada between 1978 and 1983, with 223 examples completed.

Design

In the 1970s the most competitive racing sailboat in PHRF and Midget Ocean Racing Club (MORC) competition was the J/24. Mirage Yachts owner Dick Steffen originally wanted to build the J/24 in Canada, but a deal with Johnstone could not be reached. Steffen instead commissioned Kirby to design a new boat to beat the J/24 and the resulting design was the Kirby 25.

The Kirby 25 is a racing keelboat, built predominantly of fibreglass. It has a fractional sloop rig, an internally-mounted spade-type rudder and a fixed fin keel. It displaces  and carries  of ballast.

The design has sleeping accommodation for four people, with a double "V"-berth in the bow cabin and two straight settee berths in the main cabin. The interior is minimalist for racing and there are no provisions for a galley or head.

The boat has a PHRF racing average handicap of 174 with a high of 187 and low of 159.

Operational history
In a 2010 review Steve Henkel wrote, "More than 200 of these popular PHRF and 'half-ton rule' racers were built by Mirage Yachts in Montreal between 1978 and 1983, after Mirage owner Dick Steflin asked Bruce Kirby to 'draw me a boat to beat the J/24s.' This 'hot' boat is generally seen as competitive and relatively inexpensive compared to the J/24 ... and is suited to racers more than cruisers. Best features: Kirby 25s are spirited, fast, and agile, with a fractional rig and bendy mast, which permits precise control of sail shape. The boats are well-made, with neat and tidy liners that double as structural elements. Worst features: The number of controls—particularly the running backstays, which need to be readjusted after every tack going upwind—may put off some inexperienced sailors and relaxed cruising types. Also, accommodations below are stripped out, as becomes a highly competitive racer. The
ends of the boat, both bow and stern, are off limits to heavy cruising supplies; fast boats always keep the ends light. In fact, a portable ice chest, Coleman stove, and portable plastic wash tub may be all that some hard-nosed racers will permit on board."

See also

List of sailing boat types

Related development
Kirby 30

Similar sailboats
Bayfield 25
Beneteau First 25.7
Beneteau First 25S
Beneteau First 260 Spirit
Bombardier 7.6
Cal 25
C&C 25
Capri 25
Catalina 25
Dufour 1800
Hunter 25.5
J/24
Jouët 760
Kelt 7.6
O'Day 25
MacGregor 25
Merit 25
Mirage 25
Northern 25
Redline 25
Sirius 26
Tanzer 25
US Yachts US 25

References

External links

Keelboats
1970s sailboat type designs
Sailing yachts
Trailer sailers
Sailboat type designs by Bruce Kirby
Sailboat types built by Mirage Yachts